John Cruickshank (born 1920) is a Scottish banker, former Royal Air Force officer, and a Second World War recipient of the Victoria Cross.

John Cruickshank may also refer to:

John Cruickshank (mathematician) (1787–1875), Scottish mathematician
John Cruickshank (literary scholar) (1924–1995), Irish scholar of French literature, language, and culture and World War II cryptologist
John D. Cruickshank (born c. 1953), Canadian newspaper publisher and (since 2017) Canadian Consul-General in Chicago